Repetek Biosphere State Reserve, often referred to as Repetek Nature or Desert Reserve, (Репетек горагханасы) is a desert nature reserve (zapovednik) of Turkmenistan, located in Lebap Province, East Karakum Desert, near Amu Darya.

Geography

The soils have sandy subsoils, but some "21 trees, 104 grasses, 8 mushrooms, 1 moss, 68 soil algae and 197 fungi" grow within the reserve.

History

The Repetek sandy desert scientific station was organized in 1912 by the decision of the Russian Geographical Society, and the reserve was established in 1928 on the base of the scientific station. During the Soviet period the reserve belongs to the Institute of Deserts of the Turkmen SSR Academy of Sciences. The list of scientific publications concerning with the Repetek sandy desert station and the biosphere reserve since 1982 to 1991 consists of about 250 papers (30% on landscape structure and geography, 20% on botany and 50% on zoology).

The Institute of Deserts, Flora and Fauna of the Academy of Sciences of Turkmenistan was established in 1962 to study ways of reclaiming desert land for economic use in the reserve. A museum is present at the site.

Environmental protection
 
The Repetek Biosphere State Reserve is part of an Important Bird Area (IBA) and since 1979 has been an under the monitoring of UNESCO but "the site is under the administration of the Ministry of Nature Protection of Turkmenistan". The reserve "supports the most complete assemblage of bird species typical of the sand desert of the Karakum" and "has an important population of Goitered Gazelle (Gazella subgutturosa) which is listed as Vulnerable (VU) in the IUCN Red List".

Climate

Repetek Biosphere State Reserve has a desert climate (Köppen climate classification BWk), with cool winters and very hot summers. Rainfall is generally light and erratic, and occurs mainly in the winter and autumn months.

Notes

References
National Program for the Protection of the Environment, Ashgabat, 2002, pp. 149–151

External links
 
Image Flickr

Nature reserves in Turkmenistan
Protected areas established in 1927
Biosphere reserves of Turkmenistan
World Heritage Tentative List